Federal Route 89, or Jalan Tanjung Belungkor, is a federal road in Johor, Malaysia.

Route background
The Kilometre Zero of the Federal Route 89 starts at Tanjung Belungkor.

Features
At most sections, the Federal Route 89 was built under the JKR R5 road standard, allowing maximum speed limit of up to 90 km/h.

List of junctions

References

Expressways and highways in Johor
Malaysian Federal Roads